Black & Grey is a Canadian pop rock/alternative band from Membertou, Nova Scotia in Cape Breton County.

The band has released one self-titled EP in 2013, and four singles: "Goodbye Misery", "What Makes You Who You Are", "Pretty Little Nightmare" and "Alone".

History
Black & Grey was formed in 2012 by Brandon Johnson of Potlotek, Nova Scotia and Michael Mellen, of Membertou, Nova Scotia. Their current line up consists of Brandon Johnson on vocals and rhythm guitar, Daniel Paul on the drums, Michael Mellen on leads, and Tyler Mellen on bass. Front-man Brandon Johnson has collaborated with artists such as Gordie Sampson, Steven MacDougall, and Dave Sampson. He also performed in Mi'kmaq Nation Halifax, and appeared on The Candy Show on APTN. His lyrics are not always black & white, often dealing with the grey area between the lines, hence the name Black & Grey.

Their debut song "Goodbye Misery" was released November 5, 2012 as a single on iTunes. The song, which speaks out against bullying was dedicated to Amanda Todd, with proceeds donated to the Leave Out Violence foundation. "Goodbye Misery" was heard throughout the Maritimes and on local radio stations.

Black & Grey's second single "What Makes You Who You Are" was first performed at the Idle No More UNITY Rally and Concert on January 17, 2013 in Truro, Nova Scotia, and the studio version was released online for download on February 11, 2013.

On March 14, 2013, the band released the music video for "Goodbye Misery" which was filmed at Sydney Academy High School by Matthew Ingraham, founder of Renegade Entertainment. Like the song, the video was also inspired by the Amanda Todd story, and starred students of Sydney Academy. Shaylin MacDonald played the role of Amanda Todd in the music video.

Black & Grey opened for Susan Aglukark who headlined the 25th anniversary of Eskasoni Powwow on July 2, 2016. They have performed at the opening of East Coast Music Week, the East Coast Music Week Aboriginal Stage, the Autism Society of Cape Breton's fundraiser Autism Rocks, the 2016 Mi'kmaq History Month Cultural Showcase, The Giant 101.9 Monster Ball (2012), the ECMA's First Nations Showcase (2013), the Sydney Tar Ponds Stronger Than Steel celebration (2013), APTN's Aboriginal Day Live 2014, the Cape Breton Screaming Eagles Home Opener (2014), the Mi'kmaq Summer Games Headliner 2014, and the Cape Breton Music Industry Cooperative's 2015 Talent Showcase.

In 2015, their EP Black & Grey was nominated as Aboriginal Recording of the Year by the East Coast Music Association, and they have performed at East Coast Music Week. In 2015, they were nominated by Music Nova Scotia as Aboriginal Artist of the year.

In September 2015, Black & Grey returned to the studio to record their latest single, "Pretty Little Nightmare", which was released October 1, 2015. The song started off 2016 as the #1 track for January 1–15 for the East Coast Countdown. It was also #8 on the Aboriginal Music Countdown. It won Best Radio Single at the 2017 Indigenous Music Awards.

In January 2022, CBRM ConnectArts announced on its Facebook page that Black & Grey had released the single “Alone”.

Discography

Extended plays

Awards
2017
 Indigenous Music Awards, Best Radio Single for "Pretty Little Nightmare"

References

Canadian alternative rock groups
Canadian indie rock groups
Musical groups from Nova Scotia